was a Japanese samurai of the late Edo period through early Meiji period.

Background
The son of an ashigaru of the Kaga Domain, he was famous as the lead assassin of the powerful politician Ōkubo Toshimichi on May 14, 1878. Following the assassination, he and the other assassins turned themselves in and all were executed in July of the same year.

References

1848 births
1878 deaths
Japanese assassins
Japanese swordfighters
People of Meiji-period Japan
People from Ishikawa Prefecture
Samurai
19th-century executions by Japan
Executed assassins